Homeward may refer to:

 Homeward (film), a 2019 film
 "Homeward" (song), a song by The Sundays from their 1997 album Static and Silence
 "Homeward" (TNG episode), a Star Trek: The Next Generation episode from the seventh season
 Homeward, a 2020 mockbuster animated film by The Asylum to Pixar's Onward

See also

 Homeward Bound (disambiguation)